Lac de Lessy is a lake at Le Petit-Bornand-les-Glières in the Haute-Savoie, France.

Lakes of Haute-Savoie